Mustafa Sabri Effendi (1869 – 1954) was the last Shaykh al-Islām of the Ottoman Empire. He is known for his opinions condemning the Turkish nationalist movement under Kemal Atatürk. Due to his resistance to Atatürk, he lived half of his life in exile in various countries, and died in Egypt.

Life 
His father was Ahmed Efendi. He was born in Tokat in 1869. He began his education in his hometown and quickly memorized the Quran. He pursued his education in Kayseri and Istanbul, where he studied under Ahmed Asim Efendi and received his certificate of proficiency (icazetname). He married the daughter of his master Asım Efendi. He passed the Rüus-ı Tedris examination (teaching qualification exam) and became a teacher (müderris) at Fatih mosque.

From 1898 until 1914, he attended Huzur lessons (lectures and discussions given by the ulema in the presence of the Sultan). Between 1900 and 1904, he was the librarian (hafiz-i kutub) of Sultan Abdul Hamid II (r. 1876–1909).

After the re-establishment of the Constitution on July 1908, he entered Parliament as the representative of Tokat. From 1908 to 1912, he was the chief editor of the journal Bayan-ul-Haq (the Exposition of Truth), an intellectual journal published by the Cemiyet-i İlmiye (Religious Scholars’ Association). Although he thanked the CUP (Committee of Union and Progress) and the army in an article in the first issue of Bayan-ul-Haq for ending the Hamidian regime, shortly afterwards he joined the opposition to the party. 

He became the founding member of the Ahali (People) party in 1910 and the Hürriyet ve İtilaf (Liberal Entente) party in 1911. In 1912, he participated in the foundation of another political organization, the Cemiyet-i İttihad-i Islamiye (Islamic Union Association). 

In January 1913, after the Bab-i Ali coup, he fled to Egypt and then went to Romania, where he made his living teaching Turkish. After the occupation of Romania by Ottoman troops during the First World War, he was arrested and sent to Turkey, where he was imprisoned in Bilecik. He was exiled for a time to Bursa. After the end of the war, he again entered politics and joined Dar-ul Hikmet-i İslamiye (Islamic University). 

He became the Shaykh al-Islām, but he resigned from this post. In 1919, he was appointed as Shaykh al-Islām in the cabinet of Damad Ferid Pasha. Sabri served as the acting Grand Vizier during the absence of Damad Ferid Pasha while he was attending the Paris Peace Conference, and he was nominated to the senate after the fall of Ferid Pasha’s cabinet. He became the first president of the Cemiyet-i Müderrisin (Society of Islamic Scholars), which later became the Teali-i Islam Cemiyeti (Society for the Elevation of Islam). 

In 1920, Mustafa Sabri was again appointed as shaykh al-Islām to the second cabinet of Damad Ferid.

In 1922, he fled Turkey once more to escape arrest by the nationalists when his name appeared on a list of 150 political dissidents. He went to Romania for a second time where he published the journal Yarın (Tomorrow).

Sabri first went to Romania and then to Greece, where he published an anti-Kemalist newspaper in which he violently attacked the new Turkish regime and its founder, Kemal Atatürk (1881–1938). He later went to Hejaz, before settling in Egypt, where he continued his intellectual activities. 

In the early 1930s he went to Egypt, where he stayed until his death on 12 March 1954.

Works 
As a conservative scholar, he produced a number of works. In his writings, he opposed both Western secularism and Islamic modernism/reformism, which is affected by Westernization. He proposed a program of Islamization before and after the fall of the Ottoman Empire. He remained within the context of the traditional Ash'arite-Maturidite theology and Ottoman madrasa system. In Egypt, he wrote several books in Arabic in response to such modernist thinkers as Muhammad Farid Wajdi and 'Abbas Mahmud al-'Aqqad as well as Jamal al-Din al-Afghani, Muhammad 'Abduh, and Muhammad Mustafa al-Maraghi.

He also criticized the views of some Egyptian intellectuals such as: Qasim Amin, Zaki Mubarak, Zaki Naguib Mahmoud, Muhammed Hussein Heikal, Taha Hussein, and 'Ali 'Abdel Raziq, who remained under the influence of Westernization and interpreted the Islamic religion according to Western thought and values.

He responded to the allegations of the Arab historian Muhammad 'Abdullah 'Inan against the Ottoman Turks and refuted his theses. He insisted that Islam was not in conflict with science and it was a religious obligation to cover women according to certain conditions.

One of the persons that he debated on scholarly issues was Mahmud Shaltut, who took office in various levels and rose to prominence with his reformist thoughts. He objected the fatwa of Shaltut who used the thesis that there is no open expression in Quran and in Hadith that support the ascension and descent of Prophet Isa in such as extend to form the basis of faith and the person who rejected this belief would not be in trouble with in terms of faith. He criticized Shaltut and he gave answers to his assertions and the evidences he used.

Mustafa Sabri criticized Musa Bigiev's thought and called him the "Luther of Islam." He also criticized some poets like Jamil Sidqi al-Zahawi and Ahmad Shawqi.

After the abolition of the Sultanate and the position of Shaykh al-Islām in 1922, he published his Al-Nakir 'ala Munkiri al-Ni'ma min al-Din wa-al-Khilafa wa-al-Umma. Completed before the abolition decision was made, Sabri's book mentioned the fate of the caliphate very briefly at the conclusion of his work, only as an additional proof for the arguments already advanced in the book. This work is a strong attack on the Kemalists and their evolving vision for post-Ottoman Turkey.

Sabri presents the Kemalists as decadents, Turkish chauvinists who colluded with the British against Islam and the caliphate, and Kemal Atatürk as a concealed Jew. Although the caliphate is not the main focus of the book, Sabri defends the last Sultan/Caliph and describes the separation of the Turkish government from the caliphate as a premeditated step on the part of the Kemalists to establish a non-Islamic government in Turkey.

In the Mas'alat Tarjamat al-Qur'an, Mustafa Sabri takes up the issue of using the translation of Qur'anic verses in ritual prayers. The book is a direct response to Atatürk's attempt to have all prayers performed in modern Turkish rather than in their original form in Arabic.

His four-volume magnum opus Mawqif al-'Aql wa-al-'Ilm wa-al-'Alim min Rabb al-'Alamin wa-'Ibadihi al-Mursalin is devoted to a detailed analysis and criticism of many issues of twentieth-century Islamic modernism.

See also

Notes

References

Further reading 
 
 
 
 For Mustafa Sabri’s biography see İsmail Kara, Türkiyede İslamcılık Dü؛üncesi, Istanbul: Kitabevi, pp. 383–385. See also Mustafa Sabri Efendi, Hilafetin İlgasının Arka Planı, Istanbul: İnsan Yayınları, 2007 (hereafter cited as Sabri, Hilafet).

External links
 A Topic of Dispute in Islam: Music by Mustafa Sabri Efendi (Beyan-ul-Haq, issue: 63, year: 2, vol: 3, 1910)
 Mustafa Sabri Efendi: Said Nursi haklı, biz hata ettik! 
 Kahire’de bir Şeyhülislam: Mustafa Sabri Efendi 

1869 births
1954 deaths
Hanafis
Maturidis
Asharis
Academic staff of Al-Azhar University
Islam and secularism
Islamic philosophers
20th-century Muslim theologians
Sunni Muslim scholars of Islam
Sunni fiqh scholars
Sheikh-ul-Islams of the Ottoman Empire
Turkish Sunni Muslim scholars of Islam
Turkish Sunni Muslims
Turkish muftis
Turkish writers
Turkish politicians
Turkish Islamists
Politicians of the Ottoman Empire
Critics of Ibn Arabi
Critics of Ibn Taymiyya
Critics of Ibn al-Qayyim
Critics of Kemalism
People from Tokat
Islamic scholars from the Ottoman Empire
Shaykh al-Islāms